Raphitoma philberti is a species of sea snail, a marine gastropod mollusk in the family Raphitomidae.

Description
The length of the shell varies between 6 mm and 14 mm.

The shell is turreted and fusiform. It contains about six convex whorls. They contain longitudinally rather tuberculated ribs that are decussated by coarse, elevated, transverse striae. The outer lip is thickened within, somewhat contracting the aperture, and strongly dentated with seven or eight elevated teeth. It has a moderately sized sinus immediately at the suture.
Coloration uniformly tawny-reddish, from light to dark, with whitish blotches as wide as two axials usually vanishing towards the suture. Comma-shaped white spots on the subsutural ramp. Soft parts foot sharped bilobed anteriorly. Black eyes at proximal 1/3 of tentacles. Foot and cephalic tentacles withish/yellowish semi-transparent with many bright white spots, head semi-transparent greyish/blackish. Siphon blackish with withish spots and a whitish ring at top.

Distribution
This species occurs in the Northern Atlantic Ocean and in the Mediterranean Sea.

References

 Gofas, S.; Le Renard, J.; Bouchet, P. (2001). Mollusca. in: Costello, M.J. et al. (eds), European Register of Marine Species: a check-list of the marine species in Europe and a bibliography of guides to their identification. Patrimoines Naturels. 50: 180–213.
 Giannuzzi-Savelli R., Pusateri F. & Bartolini S., 2018. A revision of the Mediterranean Raphitomidae (Gastropoda: Conoidea) 5: loss of planktotrophy and pairs of species, with the description of four new species. Bollettino Malacologico 54, Suppl. 11: 1–77

External links
 Michaud A. L. G. (1829). Description de plusieurs espèces nouvelles de coquilles vivantes. Bulletin d'Histoire Naturelle de la Société Linnéenne de Bordeaux 3: 260–276, 1 pl
 Philippi R. A. (1836). Enumeratio molluscorum Siciliae cum viventium tum in tellure tertiaria fossilium, quae in itinere suo observavit. Vol. 1. Schropp, Berlin [Berolini: xiv + 267 p., pl. 1–12]
 Bellardi L. (1877), I molluschi dei terreni terziarii del Piemonte e della Liguria /
  Carus, Julius Victor, Prodromus faunae mediterraneae, sive Descriptio animalium Maris Mediterranei incolarum, quam comparata silva rerum quatenus innotuit, adiectis locis et nominibus vulgaribus eorumque auctoribus; Stuttgart,E. Schweizerbart,1885-93
 Scacchi, A. (1836). Catalogus Conchyliorum regni Neapolitani. Neapoli [Naples, Typis Filiatre-Sebetii 18 p., 1 pl.]
 
  Tucker, J.K. 2004 Catalog of recent and fossil turrids (Mollusca: Gastropoda). Zootaxa 682:1–1295
 Biolib.cz : Raphitoma philberti
 Natural History Museum, Rotterdam: Raphitoma philberti

philberti
Gastropods described in 1829